Spring Street is a major street in the central business district of Melbourne, Australia. It runs roughly north-south and is the easternmost street in the original 1837 Hoddle Grid.

Spring Street is famous as the traditional seat of the Government of Victoria, as well as being central to many of the state's major cultural institutions. The street's name is frequently used as a metonym to refer to the state's bureaucracy. Spring Street is also notable for its impressive Victorian architecture, including Melbourne Parliament House, the Old Treasury Building, the Windsor Hotel (also known as Duchess of Spring Street) and the Princess Theatre. 

The street is thought to be named after Baron Thomas Spring Rice, Chancellor of the Exchequer under Lord Melbourne. An alternative theory is that the name is due to the golden wattle trees in full bloom during Richard Bourke's visit.

Geography 
The street runs from Flinders Street in the south to Victoria Street and the Carlton Gardens in the north. Nicholson Street branches off from Spring Street, slightly south of its intersection with Lonsdale Street.

Notable buildings

Spring Street has a number of architecturally notable buildings and important gardens, with many featuring on the Victorian Heritage Register and/or National Trust of Australia. These include:

Victorian Heritage Register 
 Parliament House (1856)*
 Old Treasury Building (1862)*
 Treasury Gardens (1867)*
 Gordon Reserve (1870)*
 Hotel Windsor (1885)*
 Princess Theatre (1886)*
 Alcaston House (1929) an early apartment building designed by A&K Henderson in the palazzo style to complement the wider area
 Royal Australasian College of Surgeons (1935)*
*Also classified by the National Trust

National Trust 
 Holy Name Sisters (1913)

Other Prominent Structures 
 Parliament railway station (1983) an underground railway station built for the City Loop
 1 Collins Street (1985) a post-modern tower by Denton Corker Marshall amongst the city's first to incorporate heritage buildings
 Casselden Place (1992) a tall office building which is home to government offices
 Shell House (1988) at the corner of Spring and Flinders Street is a notable granite clad office tower designed by Harry Seidler in a similar style to his buildings in Sydney and Brisbane. The building's floor plates are in the shape of a shell as it was the Australian Head Office of Royal Dutch Shell.

Parks and gardens

Spring Street forms the western border of the Treasury Gardens. Gordon Reserve, a small triangle of parkland featuring heritage listed statues, is also located on Spring Street. Another small Chinese garden, known as the Tianjin Garden, is also located at the northern end of Spring Street. It is a symbol of Melbourne's close friendship with its sister city, Tianjin, China.

Transport
A number of tram routes run along Spring Street for all or part of its length, including the City Circle Tram, route 48 and route 96. 

Parliament railway station, connecting to most suburban Melbourne train lines as part of the underground City Loop, lies directly beneath and parallel to Spring Street.

See also

References
 

Streets in Melbourne City Centre